Talnikovy is a rural locality (a settlement) in Buzansky Selsoviet, Krasnoyarsky District, Astrakhan Oblast, Russia. The population was 443 as of 2010. There are 9 streets.

Geography 
Talnikovy is located 42 km northwest of Krasny Yar (the district's administrative centre) by road. Delta is the nearest rural locality.

References 

Rural localities in Krasnoyarsky District, Astrakhan Oblast